Christian Ludwig Bokelmann (4 February 1844 in St.Jürgen, near Bremen – 14 May 1894 in Berlin) was a German genre painter in the Realistic and Naturalistic styles; associated with the Düsseldorfer Malerschule.

Biography 
His father was a teacher and organist. At the request of his parents, he studied business in Lüneburg and Hamburg-Harburg, with the aim of becoming a merchant. He worked in a cigar factory first, then a comb factory. After his father's death in 1868, he followed his true inclinations and enrolled at the Kunstakademie Düsseldorf, where he studied with Ludwig Knaus until 1871. After that, he took private lessons from Wilhelm Sohn.

In 1873, he had his first major showing at the World Exposition in Vienna and, the following year, began exhibiting regularly at the Prussian Academy of Arts. In 1877, he was awarded a gold medal at an exhibition in Ghent. During the 1880s, he undertook an extensive study trip through the marshlands of North Friesland; inspired by the "Volkskunde" (ethnographic) approach to painting, pioneered by Rudolf Jordan. In 1883, he became associated with the artists' colony at Katwijk.

From 1892 to 1893, he worked as a professor of genre painting at the Academy of Fine Arts, Karlsruhe, then transferred to the Berlin University of the Arts. In both positions, his friend, Fritz Mackensen, served as his personal assistant. He also became a member of "Malkasten", a progressive art society in Düsseldorf, and the Prussian Academy.

He died after falling off a ladder in his studio, while attempting to hang a laurel wreath that had been given to him by his students on the occasion of his 50th birthday.

Selected paintings

References

Further reading
 Barbara Hodel: Christian Ludwig Bokelmann (1844–1894). Monographie und Werkkatalog. Europäische Hochschulschriften: Kunstgeschichte, Vol.46, Peter Lang, 1985,  
 Ernst Schlee: Der Maler Christian Ludwig Bokelmann als Darsteller des nordfriesischen Volkslebens. In: Nordelbingen, Issue #55, 1986 
 Rüdiger Articus, Ralf Busch: Christian Ludwig Bokelmann. Ein wiederentdeckter Volkslebenmaler des 19. Jahrhunderts. Publications of the Hamburger Museums für Archäologie und Geschichte Harburgs, Issue #68, 1994

External links

ArtNet: More works by Bokelmann 
Engraving of Bokelmann @ Alamy (with watermarks)

1844 births
1894 deaths
19th-century German painters
19th-century German male artists
German genre painters
Kunstakademie Düsseldorf alumni
Social realist artists
People from Bremen (state)
Accidental deaths from falls